The May Bumps (also May Races, Mays) are a set of rowing races, held annually on the River Cam in Cambridge, England. They began in 1887 after separating from the Lent Bumps, the equivalent bumping races held at the end of February or start of March. Prior to the separation there had been a single set of annual bumps dating from its inception in 1827. The races are open to all college boat clubs from the University of Cambridge, the University Medical and Veterinary Schools and the Anglia Ruskin Boat Club. The May Bumps takes place over four days (Wednesday to Saturday) in mid-June and is run as a bumps race.

The most recent in the series was the May Bumps 2019, which ran from 12 June 2019 until 15 June 2019.

Structure of the May Bumps 

The races are run in divisions, each containing 17 crews. The number of crews in each bottom division varies yearly depending on new entrants. Each crew contains eight rowers and one coxswain. A total of 154 crews took part in 2014, totalling around 1390 participants. There are currently six divisions for men's crews (referred to as M1, M2...M6) and four divisions for women's crews (similarly W1–W4). The divisions represent a total race order with Division 1 at the top. The ultimate aim is to try and finish Head of the River (also said as gaining the 'Headship'), i.e. 1st position in division 1.

At the start, signalled by a cannon, each crew is separated by a distance of about  boat lengths (approximately 30 m or 90 ft). Once the race has begun, a crew must attempt to catch up with the crew ahead of it and bump (physically touch or overtake) it before the crew behind does the same to them. A crew which bumps or is bumped must pull to the side of the river to allow all the other crews to continue racing. If a crew is able to catch and bump the boat which started three places in front of it, after the two in front have already bumped out, the crew is said to have over-bumped. A crew which neither bumps a crew ahead nor is bumped by a crew behind before crossing the finishing post is said to have rowed over.

After the race, any crew which bumps or over-bumps swaps places with the crew that it has bumped for the following day's racing. A crew which rows over stays in the same position. Crews finishing at the top of a division also start at the bottom of the next division, as the sandwich boat, in an attempt to try to move up into the next division. The process is repeated over four days, allowing crews to move up or down several places in the overall order of boats. The finishing order of one year's May Bumps are then used as the starting order of the following year's races.

Crews finishing Head of the River

Men's May Bumps (1887–2022) 

N.B.: May Bumps were cancelled between 1915 and 1918, and in 1940 due to war, and in 2020 and 2021 due to the COVID-19 pandemic. Prior to 1946  were two separate rowing clubs: 1st Trinity and 3rd Trinity, hence both separate and combined titles.

Women's May Bumps (1974–2022) 

N.B.: The Women's May Bumps were rowed in coxed-fours between 1974 and 1989, changing to coxed-eights from 1990 onwards. A new start order was used for the women's 1990 races. May Bumps were cancelled in 2020 and 2021 due to the COVID-19 pandemic.

Table of winning boats (1887–2022)
Sixteen boats have been head of the river.

N.B.: Prior to 1946  were two separate rowing clubs: 1st Trinity and 3rd Trinity, hence both separate and combined titles.

Anglia Ruskin, Christ's, Clare Hall, Corpus Christi, Darwin, Girton, Homerton, Hughes Hall, King's, Magdalene, Peterhouse, Robinson, St. Catharine's, Selwyn, Sidney Sussex, St Edmund's, Wolfson, Addenbrooke's and the Veterinary School are the regular entrants never to have finished Head of the River for either the men's or women's events.

Blades, Super-Blades, Technical Blades, and Spoons 
Four boat 'awards' are informally/formally recognised by the individual college boat clubs that take part in the Cambridge May Bumps, these accolades are awarded as follows:

 Blades: The accolade of earning 'blades' (referring to the rowing oars used by crews) is given to crews that bump up on every day of the May bumps (alternately four bump ups for boats in the 'Sandwich Division'). Crews that achieve blades are often given the opportunity to purchase decoratory oars from their college boat club, to serve as a reminder of their contribution to the club's success. For most college rowers, who do not attempt to become University Blues rowers, earning blades is the highest rowing related achievement that can be obtained. Obtaining blades is a rare occurrence. Crews who obtain blades are often photographed and recorded on the walls of the college boathouse to serve as a longer term reminder of their success, and to inspire future generations of college rowers. In the occasion that a crew earns blades, they also earn the right to row back to their college boathouse on the last day of the calendar with their college flag raised high; this practise allows for recognition of the (significant) achievement by members of other college boat clubs and the general public watching the races.
 Super-Blades: In the event that a crew bumps and/or overbumps on the river four times (with no row overs/bumping down) they are said to have earned 'super-blades'. This is obviously a higher distinction that standard 'Blades' but is of course rarer due to the particularly circumstantial nature of the award, and the ability of the super-bladed crew that is required.
 Technical Blades: In the case that a crew does not bump up on each day of rowing (at least), but does manage to bump up net four places in the overall standings over the course of the week, with no bumping down, i.e. 'making up' for any row overs with an overbump, then they are said to have qualified (at the discretion of the boatsperson at each college boat club) for 'Technical Blades'. Technical bladed rowers are usually afforded the same opportunity to obtain a ceremonial blade as those crews that obtain regular blades.
 Spoons: This 'award' is obtained by crews that bump down on every day of the May bumps calendar. The awarding of spoons is an informal occasion by the crew captain, often this captain will actually buy a wooden spoon (decorated) for each crew member as a reminder that "at least they tried".

The Pegasus Cup 

The Pegasus Cup is a Cambridge  rowing prize first awarded in 2006. It was donated by Milton Brewery and will be awarded annually to the most successful college boat club competing in the Cambridge May Bumping Races. The winner is decided by means of a points system, which is described in the Cambridge University Combined Boat Club handbook as follows:

To be eligible a club must have at least one men's and one women's boat (except in the case of single sex colleges where two boats of the same sex may be permitted). In the coronavirus year of 2020, May Bumps were not held. Instead, the Pegasus Cup was awarded to the Cambridge college boat club whose members raised the greatest sum for charity (per capita)—Lady Margaret Boat Club, who raised over £3500. The year is asterisked on the Pegasus Cup to distinguish this unusual occurrence.

Winners

 2006: 
 2007: 
 2008: 
 2009: 
 2010: 
 2011: 
 2012: 
 2013: 
 2014: /
 2015: 
 2016:  
 2017: 
 2018: 
 2019: 
 2020*:

2022 finishing positions (2023 starting positions) 

Results:

Men's 1st Division 

 
 
 
 
 
 
 
 
 
 
 
  II

Women's 1st Division

See also
 Eights Week, the equivalent event at Oxford
 Lent Bumps, the twinned event in Cambridge in late February or early March
 Links to individual May Bumps results

References

External links

 CUCBC—the organisation that runs the bumps
 Cambridge bumps charts—archive of results 1992–-2005

1887 establishments in England
Annual sporting events in the United Kingdom
Bumps races
June sporting events
Recurring sporting events established in 1887
River Cam
Rowing at the University of Cambridge
Rowing competitions in the United Kingdom